Sergei Sergeyevich Davydov (born 22 July 1985) is a Russian former professional footballer. He played as a striker.

Club career

Dynamo Bryansk
Davydov started his professional career at Russian First Division side Dynamo Bryansk. Though a young talent, after not convincing, he left Dynamo Bryansk

Torpedo Moscow
In the spring of 2008 he Joined Torpedo Moscow. He played a year for the Moscow team, scoring just three goals.

Volgar-Gazprom Astrakhan
In 2009, he joined Volgar-Gazprom Astrakhan. Here he played his best football yet, helping the team to remain in the Russian first division.

Kuban Krasnodar
His good skills got him a move to ambitious club Kuban Krasnodar. In the first year with the team he scored 10 goals helping the team to earn promotion to the Russian Premier League.

Rubin Kazan
On 25 February 2012, Rubin signed a three-year contract with Davydov.

References

External links
 
 

1985 births
Living people
Russian footballers
Russian expatriate footballers
FC Torpedo Moscow players
FC Volgar Astrakhan players
FC Kuban Krasnodar players
FC Rubin Kazan players
FC Dynamo Moscow players
Russian Premier League players
Kazakhstan Premier League players
Expatriate footballers in Kazakhstan
FC Aktobe players
FC KAMAZ Naberezhnye Chelny players
Association football forwards
FC Dynamo Bryansk players
FC Ararat Moscow players